Josef Schretter (18 March 1856, Inzing - 18 March 1909, Innsbruck) was an Austrian painter; specializing in portraits and genre scenes.

Biography 

His father, Peter Paul Schretter, was a teacher and organist. After graduating, he became an assistant to the church painter,  in Zirl. From 1874 to 1878, he was enrolled at the Academy of Fine Arts, Vienna, where his primary instructors were Christian Griepenkerl, August Eisenmenger and Karl von Blaas. After 1878, he studied history painting at a private school operated by Leopold Carl Müller. 

He passed the teachers' examination for freehand drawing, returned to Innsbruck in 1879, and spent two years teaching at the Bundesrealgymnasium. Between 1881 and 1885, he made study trips to several locations in Italy, and to Tunis, where he devoted himself to painting Orientalist scenes.

From 1886 to 1891, he worked as a portrait painter in Munich. He then settled permanently in Innsbruck, but travelled extensively throughout Northern Europe, to execute works on commission; portraying numerous members of the German, Danish, Dutch and Russian nobilities. In recognition of these achievements he was named a Professor by the Grand Duchy of Mecklenburg-Schwerin.

In 1899, he married Anna Gaisberger, the daughter of a hotelier, and they had two children. In 1907, he acquired the studios belonging to the late landscape painter, Edmund von Wörndle. He died two years later, aged only fifty-three, shortly after being diagnosed with cancer. 

Streets in Innsbruck and Inzing have been named after him.

While most of his works are in private collections, some may be seen at the Tyrolean State Museum, the Österreichische Galerie Belvedere and the Staatliches Museum Schwerin.

References

Further reading 
 Josef Schretter. Ein Tiroler Maler an deutschen Fürstenhöfen. In: Dorfzeitung Inzing. Nr. 4, 1987, S. 8–9 (Online)
 
 Sybille-Karin Moser: "Tiroler Bilder und ihre Darstellung in den Schönen Künsten: Malerei in Tirol 1830–1900". In: Paul Naredi-Rainer, Lukas Madersbacher (Eds.): Kunst in Tirol. Vol.2: Vom Barock bis in die Gegenwart, Tyrolia, Innsbruc, 2007, pp.519–560 (Online)
 Josef Schärmer: Prof. Josef Schretter (1856–1909): Leben – Werk – Stellung in seiner Zeit. Dissertation, Leopold-Franzens-Universität, Innsbruck 1991.

External links 

 Josef Schretter @ Digitalen Belvedere

1856 births
1909 deaths
Austrian painters
Austrian portrait painters
Austrian genre painters
Academy of Fine Arts Vienna alumni
Deaths from cancer in Austria
People from Tyrol (state)